The 2022 Senate election in the Philippines occurred on May 9, 2022 to elect one-half of the Senate. The senators elected in 2022, together with those elected in 2019, comprise the Senate's delegation in the 19th Congress.

The proclamation of all the 12 senators was done nine days after Election Day, on May 18. four incumbents that ran successfully defended their seats, while five former and three new senators were elected.

Manner of election
Senators are elected on a nationwide, at-large basis via plurality-at-large voting system. A voter has twelve votes: the voter can vote for up to twelve candidates. Votes are tallied nationwide and the twelve candidates with the highest number of votes are elected to the Senate. The Commission on Elections administers elections for the Senate, with the Senate Electoral Tribunal deciding election disputes after a Senator has taken office.

Senators elected in 2022
Key: Boldface: incumbent, italicized: neophyte senator
*Senators are elected on a nationwide, at-large basis.

See also
List of representatives elected in the Philippine House of Representatives elections, 2022

References 

2022 Philippine general election